"Auto-da-Fé" is a short story by Roger Zelazny from Harlan Ellison's science fiction anthology Dangerous Visions. The plot concerns a contest analogous to a bullfight between humans and autonomous cars, with human "mechadors" who combat robotic Chevrolets or Pontiacs. It has been reprinted at least 40 times, in at least 4 languages.

The title is a play on words involving the phrases auto-da-fé and automobile.

References

External links 
 from Sci Fiction

1967 short stories
Short stories by Roger Zelazny
Dangerous Visions short stories